CHOBA B CCCP (also known as The Russian Album) is the seventh solo studio album by Paul McCartney under his own name, originally released in October 1988 exclusively in the Soviet Union. The album consists entirely of live-in-studio recordings of covers, mainly of rock and roll oldies. With the addition of an extra track, it was released internationally in 1991.

Background and recording
Following the tepid reaction to his 1986 studio album Press to Play, McCartney spent much of the first half of 1987 plotting his next album. In March he recorded an album's worth of songs with producer Phil Ramone, but those sessions only produced the single "Once Upon a Long Ago" backed with "Back on My Feet", released only in the United Kingdom that November.

Following a series of jam sessions with various British musicians where they played some of his favourite songs from the 1950s, McCartney decided to record the songs live in the studio. Over the course of two days in July 1987, McCartney recorded twenty songs.

Other tracks recorded during the sessions but not included on the Melodiya album were "I'm in Love Again" (though it was included on the subsequent international release) and "I Wanna Cry" (an original song) released on the B-side of McCartney's "This One" maxi-single in 1989, as well as "It's Now or Never" on the New Musical Express album The Last Temptation of Elvis in 1990. A version of the Beatles' "I Saw Her Standing There" was also recorded but remains unreleased.

Title and artwork
The title «» is Russian for "Back in the U.S.S.R.", the name of a 1968 Beatles song. The album is also known as Back in the USSR and the Russian Album. The first word of the album's title is often mispronounced by English speakers as  rather than the more accurate  (the Cyrillic alphabet has a different pronunciation for the characters "С", "H", and "В" than the English alphabet).

The cover was designed by Michael Ross. The Russian release includes liner notes written by Roy Carr of New Musical Express, translated into Russian.

In the first year of release the album sold more than 400,000 copies.

Release
McCartney originally wanted to release the album in the United Kingdom outside regular distribution channels, making it appear as if the album had been smuggled in from the Soviet Union. EMI turned down that idea. Nonetheless, McCartney's manager had a batch of LPs pressed, with Russian-language covers, as a Christmas present to McCartney. This gave McCartney the idea to release the album in the Soviet Union as a gesture of peace in the spirit of glasnost. An agreement was reached with the Soviet government-run record company Melodiya to license 400,000 copies of the album for release in the Soviet Union only with no exports. The album was released in the Soviet Union on 31 October 1988. The first pressing of 50,000 copies contained 11 tracks and sold out almost immediately. A second pressing with two additional tracks was released about a month later.

Soon after its release, the album began appearing for sale outside the Soviet Union for prices ranging from $100 to $250 in the United States and up to £500 in the United Kingdom. The album was eventually given a worldwide release in 1991, reaching number 63 in the UK and number 109 in the US.

Despite the fact that the album was not initially released in western markets, half of the album worth of songs were released as singles' B-sides from 1987 to 1989: "Midnight Special", "Don't Get Around Much Anymore", "Lawdy Miss Clawdy" and "Kansas City" appeared on various versions of "Once Upon a Long Ago", "I'm Gonna Be a Wheel Someday" and "Ain't That a Shame" on "My Brave Face" while "I Wanna Cry" and edited version of "I'm in Love Again" on "This One" single.

Reception

Rhapsody praised the album, calling it one of their favourite cover albums.

Track listing

Digital download edition

The digital download edition has the same track listing and running order as the original 11-track vinyl release.

2019 Capitol Remaster Re-Release

The 2019 Remaster Re-Release edition has the same track listing and running order as the original 11-track Melodija-vinyl release. The 2019 version was remastered at Abbey Road Studios as part of the McCartney catalogue re-releases through Capitol records and part of the live-bundle. CHOBA B CCCP was released as a Live-in-studio-Album. Each of the four re-released albums came out as CD, Vinyl and limited edition colored vinyl.

Personnel 
All tracks recorded 20 July 1987 except "Don't Get Around Much Anymore", "Ain't That a Shame" and "Crackin' Up", recorded on 21 July.

20 July
 Paul McCartney – bass guitar, vocals
 Mick Green – guitar
 Mick Gallagher – piano
 Chris Whitten – drums

21 July
 Paul McCartney – guitar, vocals
 Nick Garvey – bass guitar, backing vocals
 Henry Spinetti – drums
 Mick Gallagher – keyboards

Charts

See also
Концерт, by Billy Joel
Run Devil Run
Kisses on the Bottom

References

External links

Paul McCartney albums
1988 albums
Parlophone albums
Rockabilly albums
Albums produced by Paul McCartney
Covers albums
Melodiya albums
British rock-and-roll albums